A Hero in His Slippers is a 1958 Greek comedy film directed by Alekos Sakellarios.

Cast 
 Vasilis Logothetidis - General Labros Dekavallas
 Ilya Livykou - Popi Dekavalla
 Nitsa Tsaganea - Eirini Dekavala
  - Julia Dekavalla
 Lavrentis Dianellos - Apostolos Dekavallas
 Byron Pallis - Kostas Stoupatis
 Vangelis Protopapas - Sotiris Liveriadis Onaxios 
 Giorgos Gavriilidis - Angelos Stamoulis

References

External links 

1958 comedy films
Greek comedy films
1950s Greek-language films